Bonanza Peak may refer to any of several mountain in the United States:

 Bonanza Peak (Alaska)
 Bonanza Peak (Idaho)
 Bonanza Peak (Nevada)
 Bonanza Peak (Washington)